Custer Monument is a monument at the United States Military Academy Cemetery, in honor of Lieutenant Colonel George Armstrong Custer who was killed along with his immediate command at the Battle of the Little Bighorn on 25 June 1876.  Congress approved of a statue, to be made from 20 condemned bronze cannons, and for $10,000, of which $6,000 had been subscribed by citizens of New York. The monument was originally located near the academy's headquarters building near the site of present-day Taylor Hall along Thayer Road.  Unveiled in 1879, the pedestal had a bronze statue of Custer wielding a saber and a pistol.  Custer's widow and many officers did not approve of this likeness and after only five years, the statue was removed and sent to New York City where Stanford White was supposed to remove the bust, to be displayed in the library.  However, after White's murder, its whereabouts have since been lost. The pedestal was moved to Custer's grave site in the West Point Cemetery during the construction of Taylor Hall around 1910.  In 1965, a stone obelisk was placed atop the pedestal.

References

Monuments and memorials at West Point
1879 sculptures
Bronze sculptures in New York (state)
1879 establishments in New York (state)